The Flowers and Plants Association is a UK organisation that supports the horticulture and floriculture business, usually associated with garden centres.

History
It was formed in 1984. The UK flower and plant industry is worth around £2.2 billion.

Function
It helps to run the Hampton Court Palace Flower Show. It promotes the UK flower and garden business.

Structure
It is situated just south of the Thames and the A3003 in the London Borough of Richmond upon Thames, near Barnes Hospital.

External links
Official Website
Plants Information

Video clips: F&PA YouTube channel

Audio clips: Woman's Hour December 2001

News items: Social justice in February 2007

Organizations established in 1984
Horticultural companies of the United Kingdom
Horticultural organisations based in the United Kingdom
Organisations based in the London Borough of Richmond upon Thames